Ha Seung-Jin (born August 4, 1985) is a South Korean former professional basketball player who has played in the NBA and the NBA D-League. He was a second round draft pick (46th overall) of the Portland Trail Blazers in the 2004 NBA Draft. At 7 ft 3 in, 305 lb, he was among the largest players in the NBA. He is also the first (and as of February 2023, only) South Korean to play in the NBA.

Early life and college career
Ha Seung-jin attended his father's alma mater Samil Commercial High School in Suwon with his childhood friend Yang Hee-jong, who was a year older. The duo led Samil's basketball team to its first ever national championship title. He initially planned on entering the 2003 NBA Draft held in June but decided on playing college basketball first and accepted an early offer from Yonsei University. It meant that he would be allowed to join the Yonsei team for the 2003 fall semester despite still being a high school senior. His contemporaries at Yonsei included Yang and future Jeonju KCC Egis teammate Kim Tae-sul. After playing only seven games for Yonsei, he left for the United States to join the 2004 NBA Draft.

Professional career

NBA career (2004–2007)
Ha arrived in Los Angeles, California in 2004 to prepare himself for the 2004 NBA Draft. Ha was drafted with the 46th overall selection by the Portland Trail Blazers.

He played briefly with the Portland Reign of the ABA. Ha joined the Portland Trail Blazers in the middle of the 2004-05 season. Ha played in only 19 games that season, averaging 5.5 minutes per game; however, on April 20 against the Los Angeles Lakers, he scored a career high 13 points to help the Trail Blazers win the game. During the 2005-06 season Ha was assigned to the NBA D-League's Fort Worth Flyers on March 28, 2006, where he played for five games but did not make an impact. When fellow Blazer centers Theo Ratliff and Joel Przybilla were unable to play due to injury, Ha started four games, averaging 11 minutes playing time.

On July 31, 2006, Ha was traded to the Milwaukee Bucks in a four-player deal. On October 28, 2006 (prior to the start of the 2006-07 season), he was waived by the Bucks. He was acquired by the Anaheim Arsenal of the NBA Development League on December 31, 2006, whom he spent time with.

Jeonju KCC Egis (2008–2019)
Ha returned to South Korea and joined the 2008 Korean Basketball League draft, signing with Jeonju KCC Egis. He won the 2009 and 2011 KBL Championships, winning the play-offs MVP in the latter. After the 2018-19 season ended, he became a free agent and chose to retire rather than re-sign or join another team.

National team
Ha has represented the South Korea national basketball team in the 2009 FIBA Asia Championship, 2010 Asian Games, and 2011 FIBA Asia Championship.

NBA career statistics

Regular season 

|-
| style="text-align:left;"| 2004–05
| style="text-align:left;"| Portland
| 19 || 0 || 5.5 || .435 || .000 || .545 || .9 || .1 || .1 || .3 || 1.4
|-
| style="text-align:left;"| 2005–06
| style="text-align:left;"| Portland
| 27 || 4 || 7.9 || .581 || .000 || .471 || 1.8 || .0 || .1 || .3 || 1.6
|- class="sortbottom"
| style="text-align:center;" colspan="2"| Career
| 46 || 4 || 6.9 || .519 || .000 || .500 || 1.5 || .1 || .1 || .3 || 1.5
|-

Post-retirement
In 2020, Ha became a commentator for the Korean Broadcasting System's sports channel KBS N Sports and mainly commentates for Women's Korean Basketball League (WKBL) games. He was a guest commentator for basketball events at the 2020 Summer Olympics.

Personal life
Ha is the younger of two children. His older sister, Ha Eun-joo, is also a professional basketball player. A 6'8" center, she signed with Los Angeles Sparks of the WNBA on February 6, 2006, and was later waived on May 19, for failing to arrive in Los Angeles due to a conflicting contract with Chanson V-Magic of the WJBL. In July 2006, she signed with Incheon Shinhan Bank S-Birds of the WKBL.

Their father Ha Dong-gi is a former basketball player-turned-coach who played for Myongji University and gave up the sport due to chronic injury problems. Ha Dong-gi had been a member of the team which won silver at the 1978 Asian Games.

Ha married Kim Hwa-yeong in 2012. They have a son (born in 2012) and a daughter (born in 2017).

Filmography

Television show

See also
List of tallest players in National Basketball Association history
List of Korean Basketball League annual statistical leaders

Notes

External links
 Profile at NBA.com 

1985 births
Living people
Anaheim Arsenal players
Asian Games medalists in basketball
Asian Games silver medalists for South Korea
Basketball players at the 2006 Asian Games
Basketball players at the 2010 Asian Games
Centers (basketball)
Fort Worth Flyers players
Jeonju KCC Egis players
Korean Basketball League players
Medalists at the 2010 Asian Games
National Basketball Association players from South Korea
People from Suwon
Portland Trail Blazers draft picks
Portland Trail Blazers players
South Korean expatriate basketball people in the United States
South Korean men's basketball players
South Korean basketball commentators
Yonsei University alumni
Sportspeople from Gyeonggi Province